People's Union may refer to:

Political parties
People's Union (Belgium)
People's Union of Estonia
People's Union (Iraq)
People's Union (Italy)
People's Socialist Union (Ivory Coast)
People's Union (Nigeria)
People's Union (Russia)
People's Union (Slovakia)
People's Union for Wallis and Futuna
Hungarian People's Union (Hungary)
Kenya People's Union (Kenya)
Leonese People's Union (Leon, Spain)
Spanish People's Union (Spain)

Other uses
People's Freedom Union (United States)
People's Union for Civil Liberties (India), a human rights body

See also
Popular (disambiguation)
Popular Union
Popular Unity (disambiguation)
People's Movement (disambiguation)
Popular front
Popular Front (disambiguation)
People's Party (disambiguation)
Popular Democratic Union (disambiguation)
Popular Republican Union (disambiguation)